Heliactinidia sitia is a moth of the subfamily Arctiinae. It was described by Schaus in 1910. It is found in Costa Rica.

References

Arctiinae
Moths described in 1910